McAdow is a surname. Notable people with the surname include:

Clara McAdow (1838–1896), American women's suffragist and mine owner
Maurice McAdow (1904–2001), American conductor, trumpeter, and music educator
Samuel McAdow (1760–1844), American Presbyterian minister

See also
McAdoo (surname)